Brodowski is a municipality in the state of São Paulo in Brazil. The population is 25,277 (2020 est.) in an area of 278 km². The elevation is 861 m.

The painter Cândido Portinari was born in Brodowski.

References

Municipalities in São Paulo (state)